Amanda Felicitas Stepto (born 31 July 1970) is a Canadian former actress who portrayed the role of teen mother Christine "Spike" Nelson in the Degrassi television franchise. Having no previous acting experience, Stepto rose to nationwide prominence playing the character on the critically and commercially successful CBC series Degrassi Junior High (1987-89) and its follow-up Degrassi High (1989-91). 

Spike's controversial teenage pregnancy storyline, as well as her trademark spiked hair, afforded Stepto a period of significant media attention. Degrassi Junior High was largely truncated and later dropped by the BBC in large part due to episodes about Spike's pregnancy, in spite of a UK publicity tour by the actress. As part of the Playing With Time Repertory Company, Stepto was made a Goodwill Ambassador of UNICEF Ontario and visited the Headquarters of the United Nations in New York City. In the early 1990s, Stepto was a spokesperson for Planned Parenthood and was sponsored by the organization for a controversial tour of Albertan high schools.

Stepto left acting later in the 1990s due to typecasting and loss of interest, returning to reprise the role of Spike as an adult in the first seven seasons of Degrassi: The Next Generation (2001-08). Degrassi remains her only major role. She was praised for her performance and was nominated for a Young Artist Award (as part of an ensemble) and a Gemini Award.

Biography

Early life (1970-1986) 
Amanda Felicitas Stepto was born on 31 July 1970 in Montreal, Quebec, the child of a young local woman and an "American jazz musician just passing through" Her birth mother put her up for adoption at three months old. She spent her early years residing in Meadowvale, Mississauga. In a podcast interview, Stepto said she was first exposed to punk rock when attending a concert by The Police in Oakville, Ontario in August 1981, where she witnessed the audience of punks. Stepto developed her trademark spiked hair when she was fourteen, citing Colin Abrahall, vocalist of the UK82 band GBH, as her chief stylistic inspiration. In 1987, she cited her favorite bands and artists as being Duran Duran, Billy Idol, Sex Pistols, Platinum Blonde, and The Cult. She attended the Etobicoke School of the Arts for three years, where she majored in dance and minored in drama, and later a school in Mississauga while starring in Degrassi.

Degrassi (1987-1992) 

At Etobicoke School of the Arts, Stepto learnt of an open audition for a television series named Degrassi Junior High from her drama teacher. She was the only student to act on it. She did not have a resume or professional headshots, and was required to send in a photo of herself to the production company. An argument ensued between Stepto and her parents, who felt her punk hairstyle wasn't suitable for television. She insisted she keep her hair for the picture, telling her parents, "If they don't like me, fuck them!". She was subsequently accepted.

When her character became pregnant, fans mistook her for being pregnant in real life, and would often send the actress toys. She was also often asked for advice from parents and teenage mothers on sex and pregnancy as if she was a counselor. In the United Kingdom, where Degrassi Junior High experienced its highest viewership, the BBC refused to air "It's Late" along with several other episodes, shortly before Stepto was expected to promote the series in London. 

Stepto was critical of the BBC's decision when speaking to the British press. Speaking to the Daily Mirror on 13 May 1988, Stepto called the ban "kinda silly", and elaborated: "The issues we've been dealing with in the episodes they wouldn't show happen everywhere and people are going to find out about them sooner or later." She also explained that the show intended to educate its viewers on the subject and did not encourage it at all. Stepto later recalled that the press in the United Kingdom tried to make her "talk shit" about the BBC in response to the ban. 

Stepto was among the cast of Degrassi that were named UNICEF Goodwill Ambassadors by the Ontario branch of UNICEF Canada in 1989. Along with cast member Pat Mastroianni, Stepto visited the Headquarters of the United Nations in New York City, and met with other ambassadors. She served as the narrator for the UNICEF video The Degrassi Kids Rap On Rights. 

In 1991, shortly after Degrassi High ended its run on television, Stepto along with five other cast members conducted interviews with teenagers across Canada about issues depicted in the show for a short-lived docuseries named Degrassi Talks, which aired from February to March 1992. She was the host of an episode that discussed teenage pregnancy, safe sex, and abortion. In the episode, she interviewed a woman who gave her baby up for adoption, an experience which had a profound impact on Stepto.

Post-Degrassi High and Planned Parenthood tour (1991-1994)  
Following the end of Degrassi, Stepto indicated to the Calgary Herald that she was interested in further pursuing her acting career, and stated that she was particularly interested in playing destructive, "psychotic" characters. However, she said that she experienced typecasting as a result of her previous role. She claimed she would also sabotage her own auditions to avoid getting roles in series she disliked, including the YTV musical drama series Catwalk, which she derided as a "cheesy low-budget show", and felt this may have contributed to her difficulty in continuing her acting career. During 1991 and 1992, Stepto starred in the play Flesh and Blood, written by Colin Thomas, about several young adults dealing with AIDS; the play won a Floyd S. Chalmers Canadian Play Award for playwriting in 1991. 

In 1992, she was appointed a spokesperson for Planned Parenthood in Alberta. Stepto visited Calgary as a representative of the organization in September 1992. Starting from May 1993, Stepto undertook a 37-stop tour of schools across the province to promote a campaign by Planned Parenthood; a viewing of the Degrassi Talks episode she hosted was optional. On 28 April 1993, the Calgary Herald reported that three Albertan schools had refused Stepto's presentation, though two of the schools later said that they were not aware of the program. In addition, Stepto also appeared in television, radio, and print advertisements promoting the "Just Talk About It" campaign during September 1992.

Acting career difficulties and Degrassi: The Next Generation (1995-present) 
In 1995, she starred in a supporting role in the Su Rynard short film Big Deal So What, playing the friend and colleague of the protagonist. She eventually left the acting business to concentrate on school. At the 2022 Toronto Comicon, Stepto explained that she had extreme difficulty pursuing a career in acting following the show; the roles she was offered were usually similar to Spike, and she was directly rejected for being too well-known as Spike. Additionally, she said that producers would constantly tell her that she was "too short", "too fat", or "cheeks are too full", and eventually she was "tired of all that bullshit" and left the acting business to pursue other endeavors.

She returned to reprise the role of Spike in Degrassi: The Next Generation, which begins primarily centering around Spike's daughter Emma. She appears in a recurring role for the show's first nine seasons, appearing less frequently in later seasons and departing along with the original cast following the telemovie Degrassi Takes Manhattan in 2010. She would make only a couple of minor television appearances outside of Degrassi: in 2000, she had a bit role in the pilot episode of the American medical drama Strong Medicine, where she played a lady in the waiting room. In 2007, she appeared as a guest star on the science fiction series ReGenesis, playing a scientist who dies in a car explosion caused by a dangerous biochemical. Stepto has said that she still is "drawn back into the acting world every once in a while".

Legacy

Public image 
Stepto's "outrageously-coiffed" hair, which she stated was the result of "lots of Final Net", contributed to the media attention she received during the late 1980s. Edmonton Journal staff writer Bob Remington quipped that her hairstyle resembled "a science experiment in electromagnetism". The hairstyle came to be seen as a trademark of both the actress and the character she portrayed on television. Stepto has recalled receiving unwanted attention and harassment as a result of the hairstyle. Speaking to The Grid in 2012, she said that this attention caused her confusion upon her rise to fame: "I realized I couldn’t [continue to] tell people to fuck off and stop staring at me—they were staring at me because I was on the show." 

Stepto has also recalled being forced to leave public places on multiple occasions because of her hair, once recalling an incident where she was told to leave the Toronto Eaton Centre for "lolling around", despite carrying hundreds of dollars worth of items including a dress for an upcoming awards ceremony. She also recalled getting a "strike" from her ballet teacher as the hair "didn't go with the pink getup". According to Stepto, the harassment inspired a storyline in Degrassi Junior High where Spike is mocked by a diner owner during a job interview. In later interviews, she recalled occasionally getting angry letters from other girls in the punk rock scene threatening to physically attack her because their boyfriends were attracted to her.

Degrassi 
Amanda Stepto was acclaimed for her "honest" portrayal of Spike, and the character has been cited as a "fan favourite", a "trailblazer", and important to the franchise's continuity. Ian Warden of The Canberra Times described Spike as a "lynchpin" of the series. Stepto was frequently recognized and mobbed by fans.

Personal life 
Stepto graduated from the University of Toronto with a bachelor's degree in history and political science. She briefly resided in Japan to teach English during the late 1990s. She has stated she is an advocate for animal rights, and a vegetarian. She cites Morrissey, as well as the Smiths album Meat Is Murder, as a form of validation for her vegetarianism, noting: "I reveled in finding an artist that spoke to me in that way." During the 1990s, she was the manager of the clothing store Shakti, located in the Kensington Market, and operated a jewelry booth at Lollapalooza with co-star Cathy Keenan. In 2009, she began performing as a DJ in Toronto under the name "DJ Demanda" with former co-star Stacie Mistysyn, who went under the name "Mistylicious".

As of 2017, Stepto resided in Ireland.

Award nominations 
Stepto has been nominated twice for her role as Christine "Spike" Nelson in Degrassi. In 1990, along with her co-stars, she was nominated for the Young Artist Award for Outstanding Young Ensemble Cast for Degrassi Junior High. In 1992, she was nominated for the Gemini Award for Best Performance by an Actress in a Continuing Leading Dramatic Role for Degrassi High. She appeared as a celebrity presenter at the ceremony.

Filmography

Film

Television

Theater

Notes

References

Sources

External links

 
 Amanda Stepto interview with Degrassi.ca 

1970 births
Actresses from Montreal
Anglophone Quebec people
Canadian adoptees
Canadian child actresses
Canadian expatriates in Ireland
Canadian film actresses
Canadian people of American descent
Canadian television actresses
Canadian DJs
Etobicoke School of the Arts alumni
Living people
People associated with Planned Parenthood
Sex education advocates
UNICEF Goodwill Ambassadors
University of Toronto alumni